Canisious Nyamutsita (born 14 July 1991) is a Zimbabwean long-distance runner.

In 2019, he competed in the senior men's race at the 2019 IAAF World Cross Country Championships held in Aarhus, Denmark. He finished in 87th place.

References

External links 
 

Living people
1991 births
Place of birth missing (living people)
Zimbabwean male long-distance runners
Zimbabwean male cross country runners